Firocoxib sold under the brand names Equioxx and Previcox among others, is a nonsteroidal anti-inflammatory drug of the COX-2 inhibitor (coxib) class, approved for use in horses (Equioxx) and for use in dogs (Previcox). Firocoxib is the first COX-2 inhibitor approved by the U.S. Food and Drug Administration for horses. Firocoxib is not intended or approved for use in human medicine.

Firocoxib was approved for veterinary use in the United States for dogs in July 2004, and for horses in July 2016. Firocoxib is available as a generic medication for horses and for dogs.

References

External links 
 

Dog medications
Equine medications
Furanones
Benzosulfones
COX-2 inhibitors
Nonsteroidal anti-inflammatory drugs
Ethers
Cyclopropyl compounds